Adisak Kraisorn (born 1 February 1991) is a Thai professional footballer who plays as a striker for Malaysia Super League club Terengganu and the Thailand national team.

International career
He represented Thailand at the 2013 Southeast Asian Games and the 2014 Asian Games.

He was also a part of Thailand's 2014 AFF Suzuki Cup-winning squad.

International goals

Senior 
Scores and results list Thailand's goal tally first.

Honours

Club
Buriram United
 Thai League 1 (3): 2011, 2013, 2014
 Thai FA Cup (3): 2011, 2012, 2013
 Thai League Cup (3): 2011, 2012, 2013
 Kor Royal Cup (2): 2013, 2014

Muangthong United
 Thai League 1 (1): 2016
 Thai League Cup (2): 2016, 2017
 Thailand Champions Cup (1): 2017
 Mekong Club Championship (1): 2017

International
Thailand U-19
 AFF U-19 Youth Championship (1): 2009

Thailand U-23
 Sea Games  Gold Medal (1); 2013

Thailand 
 AFF Championship (3): 2014, 2020, 2022
 King's Cup (2): 2016, 2017

Individual

 AFF Championship top scorer: 2018

References

External links
 

1991 births
Living people
Adisak Kraisorn
Adisak Kraisorn
Association football forwards
Adisak Kraisorn
Adisak Kraisorn
Adisak Kraisorn
Adisak Kraisorn
Adisak Kraisorn
Adisak Kraisorn
Adisak Kraisorn
Adisak Kraisorn
Adisak Kraisorn
Adisak Kraisorn
Adisak Kraisorn
Footballers at the 2014 Asian Games
Adisak Kraisorn
Adisak Kraisorn
Southeast Asian Games medalists in football
2019 AFC Asian Cup players
Competitors at the 2013 Southeast Asian Games
Adisak Kraisorn